Ecumenical apologetics is "an explanation (defense) of the Christian Faith, in an ecumenical fashion"; presenting a defense of one's own faith while advocating and recognizing "a greater sense of shared spirituality" with those of other confessions or faith traditions.

While neither apologetics nor ecumenism is a new term, "ecumenical apologetics" came into use early in the 21st century in an effort to combine the two, which were previously presumed to be opposing efforts or ideas.  Likewise, both apologetics and ecumenism are terms used by people of different religious orientations; however, the term is used primarily, if not exclusively, to refer to a form of Christian apologetics.

Further reading 
 Fr. Benedict M. Ashley, Choosing a World-View and Value-System: An Ecumenical Apologetics. Published by Alba House (May 2000).
 Konrad Raiser, Ecumenism in Transition: A Paradigm Shift in the Ecumenical Movement. Published by World Council of Churches (October 1991).
 George E. Griener, Ernst Troeltsch and Herman Schell: Christianity and the World Religions : An Ecumenical Contribution to the History of Apologetics.  Published by Peter Lang Pub Inc. (June 1990).

Footnotes 

Christian apologetics